The 1999 CART PPG/Dayton Indy Lights Championship consisted of 12 races. Oriol Servià was the series champion despite not winning a race.

Calendar

Race summaries

Homestead race
Held March 21 at Homestead-Miami Speedway. Mario Domínguez won the pole.

Top Five Results
 Mario Domínguez
 Airton Daré
 Scott Dixon
 Andy Boss
 Casey Mears

Long Beach race
Held April 18 at Long Beach, California Street Course. Felipe Giaffone won the pole.

Top Five Results
 Philipp Peter
 Scott Dixon
 Geoff Boss
 Didier André
 Casey Mears

Nazareth race
Held May 2 at Nazareth Speedway. Oriol Servià won the pole.

Top Five Results
 Airton Daré
 Oriol Servià
 Casey Mears
 Scott Dixon
 Ben Collins

Milwaukee race
Held June 6 at The Milwaukee Mile. Felipe Giaffone won the pole.

Top Five Results
 Derek Higgins
 Casey Mears
 Tony Renna
 Felipe Giaffone
 Oriol Servià

Portland race
Held June 20 at Portland International Raceway. Oriol Servià won the pole.

Top Five Results
 Philipp Peter
 Oriol Servià
 Guy Smith
 Casey Mears
 Airton Daré

Cleveland race
Held June 27 at Burke Lakefront Airport. Didier André won the pole.

Top Five Results
 Derek Higgins
 Oriol Servià
 Felipe Giaffone
 Philipp Peter
 Airton Daré

Toronto race
Held July 18 at Exhibition Place. Geoff Boss won the pole.

Top Five Results
 Geoff Boss
 Oriol Servià
 Didier André
 Felipe Giaffone
 Jonny Kane

Michigan race
Held July 24 at Michigan International Speedway. Jonny Kane won the pole.

Top Five Results
 Philipp Peter
 Casey Mears
 Felipe Giaffone
 Mario Domínguez
 Oriol Servià

Detroit race
Held August 8 at Belle Isle Raceway. Oriol Servià won the pole.

Top Five Results
 Derek Higgins
 Oriol Servià
 Jonny Kane
 Felipe Giaffone
 Didier André

Chicago race
Held August 22 at The Chicago Motor Speedway. Scott Dixon won the pole.

Top Five Results
 Scott Dixon
 Guy Smith
 Casey Mears
 Oriol Servià
 Mario Domínguez

Laguna Seca race
Held September 12 at Mazda Raceway Laguna Seca. Guy Smith won the pole.

Top Five Results
 Didier André
 Scott Dixon
 Jonny Kane
 Guy Smith
 Casey Mears

Fontana race
Held October 30 at The California Speedway. Jonny Kane won the pole.

Top Five Results
 Jonny Kane
 Ben Collins
 Didier André
 Cory Witherill
 Mario Domínguez

Championship standings

Drivers' championship

Scoring system

 The driver who qualifies on pole is awarded one additional point.
 An additional point is awarded to the driver who leads the most laps in a race.

Driver standings

References 

Indy Lights seasons
Indy Lights Season, 1999
Indy Lights
Indy Lights